Whitehouse High School is a public high school located in Whitehouse, Texas, and classified as a 5A school by the UIL. It is part of the Whitehouse Independent School District located in southern Smith County. In 2018, the school was rated "Met Standard" by the Texas Education Agency.

Athletics
The Whitehouse Wildcats compete in the following sports:

Baseball
Basketball
Cross country
Drill Team
Football
Cheerleaders
Golf
Swimming
Soccer
Softball
Tennis 
Track and field
Volleyball

State titles 
The Wildcats boys' basketball team won the 1977-78 2A basketball state title.

Band 
The band's accomplishments include:
U.I.L. Marching Competition Winners 32 Consecutive Years 
1989–present
U.I.L Concert and Sighting Reading 26 years sweepstakes
1989–present
Disney Bands Best Band of the Summer session
1990–present
National Association of Military Marching Bands
 Best in Show
 Best Fanfare (Triumph)

Notable alumni
Nate Brooks, NFL cornerback
Dylan Cantrell, tight end for the Washington Commanders
Jacob Holmen, former professional basketball player
Patrick Mahomes, quarterback for the Kansas City Chiefs
Nathaniel Moran, American politician
Josh Tomlin, pitcher for the Atlanta Braves

References

External links 
Whitehouse Independent School District website

Schools in Smith County, Texas
Public high schools in Texas
1904 establishments in Texas
Educational institutions established in 1904